Atlas Fútbol Club Premier was a professional football team that played in the Mexican Football League. They were currently playing in the Liga Premier (Mexico's Third Division). Atlas Fútbol Club Premier were affiliated with Club Atlas who plays in the Liga MX. The games were held in the city of Zapopan in the Estadio Alfredo "Pistache" Torres.

Players

Current squad

References

Football clubs in Jalisco
Liga Premier de México